Nahuel Lautaro Bustos (born 4 July 1998) is an Argentine professional footballer who plays as a forward for Argentinian club Talleres, on loan from Premier League club Manchester City.

Club career

Early career
Born in Córdoba, Bustos started playing for hometown side CA Huracán at the age of five. He subsequently moved to Argentino Peñarol, and on 24 February 2013, at the age of just 14 years, seven months and 20 days, he made his senior debut for the latter side by coming on as a substitute and scoring the fifth goal in a 7–0 Torneo Argentino C routing of CA Racing de Valle Hermoso.

Talleres
On 5 March 2014, Argentino Peñarol's president Ariel Allende announced that Bustos was sold to a businessman group for a fee of 40,000 pesos, and was assigned to Talleres. On 12 June of the following year, he signed his first professional contract with the club.

After appearing as an unused substitute in April 2016 for Primera B Nacional fixtures against Almagro, Gimnasia y Esgrima and Atlético Paraná, Bustos made his senior debut on 18 June, replacing Nazareno Solís late into a 1–1 away draw against Chacarita Juniors, as his side was already promoted. He made his Primera División debut on 23 April 2017, replacing Jony in a 1–0 home win against Godoy Cruz.

Bustos was part of the club's squad for the 2018 U-20 Copa Libertadores in Uruguay, a competition in which Bustos scored four goals in three matches, including a hat-trick against Atlético Venezuela. He only became a regular first team starter in September of that year, under manager Juan Pablo Vojvoda.

Bustos scored his first professional goal on 22 September 2018, netting the opener in a 1–1 home draw against Vélez Sarsfield. On 7 October, he scored a brace in a 3–0 home defeat of rivals Belgrano, taking his tally up to four goals in four matches. In 2019–20, Bustos scored ten goals in twenty-three appearances in all competitions before the season's curtailment due to the COVID-19 pandemic.

Pachuca loan
On 28 December 2018, Talleres announced that Bustos had joined Liga MX side Pachuca on loan; signing for twelve months. He netted his first goal on 8 January in a Copa MX victory away to Atlante. Bustos returned to Talleres on 20 July 2019, having played a total of eight times for Mexican club.

Manchester City
On 5 October 2020, Talleres reached an agreement with the City Football Group for the transfer of Bustos.

Girona loan
Bustos subsequently joined Girona FC in the Segunda División for the 2020–2021 season. He debuted in a 1–0 win over Real Oviedo on 18 October, before scoring his first two goals for the club in the Copa del Rey against Tercera División outfit Gimnástica Segoviana on 17 December.

São Paulo loan
On 5 August 2022, Bustos joined Série A club São Paulo on loan until June 2023, with an extra optional year.

International career
Bustos was called up to train with the Argentina U20 team ahead of the 2017 FIFA U-20 World Cup in South Korea, but was cut from the final squad.

Career statistics
.

Honours
Argentino Peñarol
Torneo del Interior: 2013
Talleres
Primera B Nacional: 2016

References

External links

1998 births
Living people
Footballers from Córdoba, Argentina
Argentine footballers
Association football forwards
Argentine expatriate footballers
Expatriate footballers in Mexico
Expatriate footballers in Spain
Expatriate footballers in Brazil
Expatriate footballers in England
Argentine expatriate sportspeople in Mexico
Argentine expatriate sportspeople in Spain
Argentine expatriate sportspeople in Brazil
Argentine expatriate sportspeople in England
Argentine Primera División players
Primera Nacional players
Liga MX players
Segunda División players
Campeonato Brasileiro Série A players
Talleres de Córdoba footballers
C.F. Pachuca players
Girona FC players
São Paulo FC players
Manchester City F.C. players